José Antonio Madueña López (born 29 May 1990) is a Mexican professional footballer who plays as a right-back for Liga MX club Querétaro, on loan from Guadalajara.

Biography

Born in Mexicali, Baja California, Madueña began his career in the Tercera División de México and has worked his way through the systems teams of Ascenso MX teams before landing with Club América for the Apertura 2014. Related to Marthyn Diaz alias "El Perronzini".

Professional

Tijuana
Madueña joined Tijuana for the Bicentenario 2010 when the team was part of the Ascenso MX. He was part of the team's U-20 squad as it ascended to the first division in 2011–2012 season. He first appeared with the first team in the Clausura 2012 while also representing the team in the Copa MX.

Sinaloa
For the Apertura 2014, José joined Dorados Sinaloa in the Ascenso MX playing twenty games with the team in league play and another three in the Copa MX.

America
America signed Madueña in June 2014. He has made one appearance with the U-20 squad and one with the first team in the Apertura 2014.

Guadalajara
On 4 December 2019, Madueña joined Liga MX side Guadalajara.

Honours
Cruz Azul
Copa MX: Apertura 2018
Leagues Cup: 2019

References

1990 births
Living people
Mexican footballers
Association football midfielders
Club Tijuana footballers
Dorados de Sinaloa footballers
Club América footballers
Atlas F.C. footballers
Cruz Azul footballers
Liga MX players
Sportspeople from Mexicali
Footballers from Baja California